Pelican is a rural locality in the Western Downs Region, Queensland, Australia. In the  Pelican had a population of 14 people.

History 
The locality is named after Pelican Station, a pastoral run operated by James Ivory in the early 1850s. It is assumed that pelicans were seen at times on nearby Pelican Lagoon.

Pelican Provisional School opened on 22 June 1908, becoming Pelican State School on 1 January 1909, closing about June 1932. It reopened in December 1940, closing in 1986. It was on Burra Burri Creek Road.

In the  Pelican had a population of 14 people.

Road infrastructure
The Chinchilla–Wondai Road runs along the southern boundary.

References

Further reading 
 

Western Downs Region
Localities in Queensland